Atenea is a biannual peer-reviewed academic journal containing research and critical reflections on Chilean and Latin American culture including arts, literature, history, sociology, and other sciences. It is published by the University of Concepción. The journal is abstracted and indexed in Arts and Humanities Citation Index, Hispanic American Periodicals Index, SciELO, and Redalyc.

Further reading

External links

Academic journals published by universities of Chile
Latin American studies journals
Publications established in 1924
University of Concepción
Spanish-language journals
1924 establishments in Chile
Biannual journals